Mamadou Koné (born 25 December 1991) is an Ivorian professional footballer who plays as a forward for Belgian First Division B club Deinze.

Club career
Born in Bingerville, Koné was a youth product of local ES Bingerville. He moved to Racing de Santander in 2010 at the age of 18 for just €240,000, being initially assigned to the reserves in Tercera División. He made his first-team – and La Liga – debut on 15 October 2011, starting in a 3–0 away loss against FC Barcelona.

Koné was definitely promoted to the Cantabrians' main squad for the 2012–13 season. He scored five goals in 35 Segunda División appearances, and the club suffered a second consecutive relegation; his first came on 22 September 2012, the only at CD Mirandés.

Koné netted 18 times in the 2013–14 campaign, helping to a return to the second tier at the first attempt. On 17 February 2015, as he again was team top scorer, he suffered a serious knee injury, being sidelined for six months.

On 18 August 2015, Koné moved to Real Oviedo of the same league in a one-year loan, with an option to make the move permanent at the end of the season. On 25 August of the following year, he signed a permanent five-year contract with top-flight CD Leganés.

Koné moved to the Belgian First Division A on 10 January 2018, being loaned to K.A.S. Eupen until June. On 17 August, he returned to Spain and its second division after joining Málaga CF also in a temporary deal.

On 19 July 2019, Koné signed with Deportivo de La Coruña on another one-year loan. He scored on his debut on 18 August to help the hosts defeat his former side Oviedo 3–2, but the season ended in relegation to the Segunda División B.

Koné returned to Eupen in the summer of 2020, on a two-year contract.

On 7 June 2022, Koné signed a two-year contract with Deinze.

Career statistics

References

External links

1991 births
Living people
People from Bingerville
Ivorian footballers
Association football forwards
Rayo Cantabria players
Racing de Santander players
Real Oviedo players
CD Leganés players
Málaga CF players
Deportivo de La Coruña players
K.A.S. Eupen players
K.M.S.K. Deinze players
La Liga players
Segunda División players
Segunda División B players
Tercera División players
Belgian Pro League players
Challenger Pro League players
Ivorian expatriate footballers
Expatriate footballers in Spain
Expatriate footballers in Belgium
Ivorian expatriate sportspeople in Spain
Ivorian expatriate sportspeople in Belgium